Dorothea of Brandenburg (died 1495), was the daughter of John, Margrave of Brandenburg-Kulmbach, and wife of Christopher of Bavaria and Christian I of Denmark.

Dorothea of Brandenburg was the name of several other princesses from the House of Hohenzollern:

 Dorothea of Brandenburg (1420–1491), daughter of Frederick I, Margrave of Brandenburg, and wife of Henry IV, Duke of Mecklenburg
 Dorothea of Brandenburg (1446–1519), daughter of Frederick II, Margrave of Brandenburg, and wife of John V, Duke of Saxe-Lauenburg
 Dorothea of Brandenburg (1471–1520), daughter of Albrecht III Achilles, Elector of Brandenburg, and Abbess in Bamberg